Kodungattu is a 1983 Indian Malayalam film, directed by Joshiy and produced by Thiruppathi Chettiyar. The film stars Prem Nazir, Madhu, K. P. Ummer, Jose Prakash, and Srividya in the lead roles. The film has musical score by K. J. Joy.

Cast
Prem Nazir as DSP Sudheendran IPS
Madhu as DSP Balachandran IPS, Sudheendran's brother
K. P. Ummer as IG R.C Sekharan Thampi IPS
Srividya as Sujatha
Jose Prakash as DSP Jayadevan IPS
Mammootty as Musthafa
Shankar as Rajan, son of Sudheendran
Sumalatha as Sreekala, daughter of Balachandran
Jalaja as Sindhu Sadanandan
Cochin Haneefa as Vijayan
Balan K Nair as Bullet Raghavan
Prathapachandran as Sadanandan
Ravi Kumar as Circle Inspector
Bheeman Raghu as Chandru
Jagathy Sreekumar as Head Constable Kuttan Pilla
Rajalakshmi as Jameela
Anuradha
Meena (actress) child artist

Soundtrack
The music was composed by K. J. Joy and the lyrics were written by Poovachal Khader.

References

External links
 

1983 films
1980s Malayalam-language films
Films directed by Joshiy